Veridagon avendanoi is an extinct aulopiform ray-finned fish related to species of Enchodus from the Cenomanian-aged Cintalapa Formation, exposed in El Chango Quarry, Chiapas, Mexico. Its original generic name was Dagon; however, this name was preoccupied by a group of South American butterflies. The generic name was eventually amended to Veridagon.

Etymology 
The original generic name refers to both Dagon, the fish god of the Philistines, and the Lovecraft character.  The amended generic name has the added suffix "veri," derived from the Latin, verus, meaning "true" or "real."

Appearance 
It depicts a fusiform animal similar in anatomy to Enchodus, with a series of small dorsally placed plates on the roof of its head.

References 

†
Cenomanian life
Late Cretaceous fish of North America
Cretaceous Mexico
Fossils of Mexico
Fossil taxa described in 2019
Dagon